Compton is a village and civil parish in the River Pang valley in the Berkshire Downs about  south of Didcot.

Geography
Compton is buffered from neighbouring  settlements by cultivated fields to all sides.  The village is in a gently-sloped dry valley and the fledgling Pang seasonally enters from the north west and discharges in the south east and may be joined at the centre of the village by the Roden from the north, when winter bournes rise to fill their channels.  Elevations vary from  AOD.Compton has a site of Special Scientific Interest (SSSI) just to the south west of the village, called Ashridge Wood.

Parish church
The bell tower of the Church of England parish church of Saint Mary and Saint Nicholas was built in the 13th century and has Perpendicular Gothic features that were added in the 15th century. In 1850 the nave and chancel were modernised or rebuilt and in 1905 the Gothic Revival architect John Oldrid Scott added the north aisle.

Transport

Former railway
In 1882 the Didcot, Newbury and Southampton Railway was completed through the parish and Compton railway station was opened. British Railways withdrew passenger services from the line and closed Compton station in 1962. BR had closed Compton goods yard by 1964. Through freight traffic was withdrawn in 1964 and the line was closed and dismantled during 1967.

Bus service
From 18 February 2013, Compton is served by Newbury and District bus services 6 and 6A from Newbury.

Amenities and economy

Education
The academically successful The Downs School local authority secondary school is in Compton. In the 21st century its new science building was named The Hubble after American astro-physicist Edwin Hubble. Compton Church of England Primary School is located on School Road. The school emblem is a stag. 

One section of the  Institute for Animal Health, now the Pirbright Institute was at Compton, along with the Edward Jenner Institute for Vaccine Research.

Industry
Despite Compton being a small village, in 2006 it became the founding place of a chemical manufacturing company called Carbosynth. Since 2019, it has merged with Swiss company Biosynth AG within the fine chemical industry and now operates under the name Biosynth®.

Demography

Nearest places

In popular culture
Substantial portions of the BBC Television series Trainer were filmed in and around Compton and the next nearest village, East Ilsley.

Notable people
Footballer Theo Walcott went to Compton Primary School and The Downs School.

References

Sources

External links

Compton Parish Council
Berkshire History: Compton
West Berkshire Council Parish Plan for Compton

Villages in Berkshire
West Berkshire District
Civil parishes in Berkshire